Bragg is an unincorporated community in Raleigh County, West Virginia, United States.

A variant name was New; the present name is after the local Bragg family.

References

Unincorporated communities in Raleigh County, West Virginia
Unincorporated communities in West Virginia